Jason Robert Sraha Osei (born 19 November 2002) is an English professional footballer who plays as a centre-back for Barnsley.

Club career
Sraha is a product of the youth academy of Chelsea, and moved to Arsenal's academy on 8 July 2019. On 29 June 2021, Sraha signed with Barnsley after being released by Arsenal. He joined Guiseley on loan in the National League North in February 2021. He returned to Barnsley, and made his professional debut with them as a starter in a 3–1 EFL Championship loss to Preston North End on 30 April 2022.

Personal life
Born in England, Sraha is of Nigerian and Ghanaian descent.

References

External links
 
 Barnsley FC U23 Profile

2002 births
Living people
Footballers from Barnsley
English footballers
English sportspeople of Nigerian descent
English sportspeople of Ghanaian descent
Association football defenders
Chelsea F.C. players
Arsenal F.C. players
Barnsley F.C. players
Guiseley A.F.C. players
English Football League players
National League (English football) players